George Burrard may refer to:

Sir George Burrard, 3rd Baronet (1769–1856), Church of England priest and baronet
Sir George Burrard, 4th Baronet (1805–1870), British politician, MP

See also
Burrard (surname)